Anderson Brown may refer to:

 Anderson Hunt Brown (1880–1974), American businessman
 Anderson W. Brown (1849–1923), Wisconsin timberman